Nights in Rodanthe is a 2008 American romantic drama film. It is an adaptation of Nicholas Sparks' 2002 novel of the same name. The film stars Richard Gere and Diane Lane in their third screen collaboration after The Cotton Club (1984) and Unfaithful (2002).

It was filmed in the small seaside village of Rodanthe, the northernmost village of the inhabited areas of Hatteras Island as well as North Topsail Beach, North Carolina.

Plot
Adrienne Willis is in the process of getting a divorce from her husband Jack after he left her for another woman. Their separation has caused a rift between her and their rebellious teenage daughter, Amanda. One morning, when picking up Amanda and their son Danny for a weekend visit, Jack tells Adrienne he still loves her and wants to move back home. She tells him she needs time and space to think.

Adrienne drives to Rodanthe, North Carolina to look after a friend's bed-and-breakfast for a few days. It is a house right on the beach, partially in the surf at high tide. The only guest for the weekend is surgeon Paul Flanner. He suffers from flashbacks of a surgery that ended tragically, which has made him cold and frustrated. The family of the patient who died lives in Rodanthe and is suing for wrongful death.

As a storm arrives, Paul and Adrienne work together to protect the inn. They dine together, share stories, and eventually turn to each other for emotional support.  A genuine romance begins and they fall in love. With Adrienne's advice and moral support, Paul finds the courage to visit the deceased patient's widower. He also feels guilty for passing up a relationship with his son Mark in favor of his career. He plans to visit Ecuador, where Mark is working as a physician in an impoverished community.

During their separation, Adrienne and Paul exchange numerous letters expressing their longing to be together again. On the evening that Adrienne and Paul are to reunite, he does not show up. Soon thereafter, Mark arrives at Adrienne's door with a box of Paul's personal belongings. He had been killed in a flash mudslide while attempting to save medical supplies. Mark thanks Adrienne for "giving him back the father he knew when he was a child".

Over the following weeks, Adrienne struggles with the grief of losing Paul. Eventually, Amanda coaxes the story from her mother. A turning point for their relationship, Adrienne begins to deal with her loss. She tells her daughter the story of the very special type of love she found with Paul, and encourages her to seek that out for herself someday.

Adrienne returns to Rodanthe and sees a small herd of wild horses on the beach by the inn. She, her children, and her best friend walk down to the dock where Adrienne and Paul once danced.

Cast
 Diane Lane as Adrienne Willis
 Richard Gere as Dr. Paul Flanner
 James Franco as Dr. Mark Flanner 
 Scott Glenn as Robert Torrelson
 Christopher Meloni as Jack Willis
 Carolyn McCormick as Jenny
 Viola Davis as Jean
 Pablo Schreiber as Charlie Torrelson
 Mae Whitman as Amanda Willis
 Charlie Tahan as Danny Willis

Post-production
The house was damaged in a hurricane after the movie was filmed.  New owners bought the house and relocated it to another part of the Outer Banks.  Tourists to the area can rent portions of the house and stay in specific rooms that have been remodeled to appear as they did in the film (actual interior scenes were filmed on sound stages). The name of the house is Serendipity.

Reception

Box office
Nights in Rodanthe has grossed $41.9 million in North America and $42.5 million in other territories for a worldwide total of $84.4 million.

In its opening weekend, the film grossed $13.4 million, finishing second at the box office behind Eagle Eye ($59.6 million). It became Warner Bros.' thirteenth highest-grossing release of 2008.

Critical reception
According to review aggregator Rotten Tomatoes, the critical consensus holds that the film is "derivative and schmaltzy" and "strongly mottled by contrivances that even the charisma of stars Diane Lane and Richard Gere can't repair". The site rates the movie as "rotten", with a score of 30% based on 132 reviews. Metacritic scored the film with a 39/100, or "generally unfavorable", based on 26 critics' reviews. Although the movie was panned, it grossed $84.4 million worldwide.

The Times included Nights in Rodanthe on its 100 Worst Films of 2008 list. In 2010, Time magazine named it one of the 10 worst chick flicks ever made.

Accolades

Home media
Nights in Rodanthe was released on DVD and Blu-ray on February 10, 2009.

References

External links
 
 
 
 

2008 films
2008 romantic drama films
American romantic drama films
Films based on works by Nicholas Sparks
Films based on romance novels
Films shot in North Carolina
Films set in North Carolina
Village Roadshow Pictures films
Warner Bros. films
Films directed by George C. Wolfe
Films produced by Denise Di Novi
2008 directorial debut films
Films scored by Jeanine Tesori
2000s English-language films
2000s American films